Santa Elena Canton is a canton of Ecuador, located in the Santa Elena Province.  Its capital is the city of Santa Elena.  Its population at the 2010 census was 144,076.

Demographics
Ethnic groups as of the Ecuadorian census of 2010:
Mestizo  79.4%
Afro-Ecuadorian  7.6%
Montubio  5.6%
White  2.5%
Indigenous  2.0%
Other  2.9%

References

Cantons of Santa Elena Province